Luke William McGregor is an Australian comedian, writer and actor, who has performed at various national and international comedy festivals, as himself in many TV shows, and is known for his roles in the ABC TV series Utopia and Rosehaven.

Early career and education 
McGregor grew up in Hobart, Tasmania, and attended Dominic College and the University of Tasmania, where he spent seven years studying law, philosophy, teaching, physics, with an eye to studying medicine, finally graduating with a combined Bachelor of Arts and Bachelor of Economics degree. After graduation, McGregor worked for Centrelink and Medicare, amongst other jobs.

Aged 25, he went along to a comedy gig with a friend and got up on stage and spoke for about five minutes. Other comedians encouraged him to continue.

In 2008 he launched his comedy career, and was a national finalist in Raw Comedy.

Career 
McGregor was a cast member on the RMITV flagship production Studio A until its final season in 2011.

In 2014, McGregor appeared as a guest on Dirty Laundry Live.

He first performed at the Melbourne International Comedy Festival in 2013, winning Best Newcomer for his show My Soulmate is Out of My League. A review of the show appeared in the Herald Sun which gave the show a four-star rating. He has also performed at the Edinburgh Festival Fringe.

He appeared in ABC TV comedy series It's a Date in 2013–2014, followed by The Time of Our Lives (2013), Legally Brown and the first two seasons of  Utopia (2014–2015).

In 2016 he collaborated with Celia Pacquola to write and star in the series Rosehaven.

His six-part comedy documentary series Luke Warm Sex, a show on sexuality and body image, aired on the ABC from March 2016.

Filmography

Television

Film

Awards 
 Best Newcomer, Melbourne International Comedy Festival, 2013
Best Newcomer, Sydney Comedy Festival, 2014
 Best Comedy Script, AWGIE Awards, 2017, for Rosehaven co-written with Celia Pacquola.
Logie Award for Most Popular Actor, 2019, for Rosehaven

References

External links 

 (includes all appearances and awards)
 Luke McGregor on Twitter

Living people
RMITV alumni
University of Tasmania alumni
Australian male comedians
Comedians from Melbourne
1983 births